Pius M. G. Griffiths was a member of the parliament of Ghana.

Griffiths held the title of Deputy Minister of Communications in the Rawlings government with responsibility for information technology. In 2000 he was Deputy Minister of Trade and Industry. He was also MP for Afigya Sekyere East constituency from January 1993 to January 1997.

Early life and education 
Griffiths was born on 20 December 1945 in Kumasi. He attended Opoku Ware School and later obtained his Master of Science degree in Mechanical Engineering from the University of Poona.

Politics 
He assumed office as a member of the 1st parliament of the 4th republic on 7 January 1993 after he emerged winner at the 1992 Ghanaian parliamentary election held on 29 December 1992. While in office, he served as the deputy Minister for Communications responsible for Information Technology. In 2000, he was appointed deputy Minister for Trade and Industry.

References

Ghanaian MPs 1993–1997
1945 births
Living people